Alex Aster is the #1 New York Times Best Selling author of the Lightlark series. Aster is a Colombian-American author and is also the author of Emblem Island, a series based on Latin American myths. She has a movie deal with Universal Studios for her novel, Lightlark.

Biography
Aster started to write books when she was thirteen. Her Latin American heritage serves as an inspiration for her writing. Aster graduated from the University of Pennsylvania in 2017 and landed an agent on her graduation day.

Works 

Emblem Island series
Curse of the Night Witch
Curse of the Forgotten City

The Lightlark Saga
Lightlark

References

21st-century American novelists
American women novelists
University of Pennsylvania alumni
American children's writers
American women children's writers
21st-century pseudonymous writers
Pseudonymous women writers
Year of birth missing (living people)
Living people